Aluminium citrate (aluminum citrate) is a chemical compound with the chemical formula . This white, crystalline salt is produced by mixing aluminium chloride hexahydrate and citric acid.

Uses
Aluminum citrate can be used as a crosslinker for many polymers in the oil industry. It is also used as an antiperspirant.

Effects on humans
Aluminium citrate takes up about 8% of aluminium in blood due to the ability of Al3+ ions to replace Ca2+ from calcium citrate and is known to cause chronic renal failure because it causes an increase of phosphorus in the kidneys. It has been suspected to cause Alzheimer's disease but more evidence is needed. This compound can also have some positive effects on humans such as preventing silicosis. When ingested, 80% of the compound is excreted through the body through urine and the rest comes out slower.

Aluminium citrate complexes
Aluminium citrate can form complexes such as ammonium aluminium citrate ((NH4)4Al3C6H4O7(OH)(H2O)), which can be created by mixing aluminium nitrate nonahydrate, citric acid, and ammonium hydroxide.

References

Aluminium compounds
Citrates